Valdas Kasparavičius (born 17 January 1958, in Kapsukas) is a former football player from Lithuania.

Kasparavičius was elected Lithuanian Footballer of the Year in 1983.

References

External links   
 

1958 births
Living people
People from Marijampolė
Lithuanian footballers
Soviet footballers
Soviet expatriate footballers
Association football defenders
FK Atlantas players
FK Žalgiris players
SKA Odesa players
FC Elektrometalurh-NZF Nikopol players
Jagiellonia Białystok players
Lithuanian expatriate footballers
Expatriate footballers in Poland
Expatriate footballers in Germany